The 2023 Princeton Tigers football team will represent Princeton University  as a member of the Ivy League during the 2023 NCAA Division I FCS football season. The team is led by 13th-year head coach Bob Surace and play its home games at Powers Field at Princeton Stadium.

Previous season

The Tigers finished the 2022 season with an overall record of 8–2 and a mark of 5–2 in conference play to finish in a tie for second place in the Ivy League.

Schedule

References

Princeton
Princeton Tigers football seasons
Princeton Tigers football